Connecticut's 84th House of Representatives district elects one member of the Connecticut House of Representatives. It encompasses parts of Meriden and has been represented by Democrat Hilda Santiago since 2013.

Recent elections

2020

2018

2016

2014

2012

References

84